The 2009 Italian motorcycle Grand Prix was the fifth round of the 2009 Grand Prix motorcycle racing season. It took place on the weekend of 29–31 May 2009 at the Mugello Circuit. The Moto GP race was won by Casey Stoner with Jorge Lorenzo second and Valentino Rossi in third place. This broke Rossi's sequence of seven consecutive victories at this event. During the weekend, Dani Pedrosa recorded the fastest speed ever for a motorcycle grand prix bike, with  breaking Makoto Tamada's record of  set in 2006. Mika Kallio and Rossi also recorded speeds above the previous benchmark.

MotoGP classification

250 cc classification

125 cc classification

Championship standings after the race (MotoGP)
Below are the standings for the top five riders and constructors after round five has concluded.

Riders' Championship standings

Constructors' Championship standings

 Note: Only the top five positions are included for both sets of standings.

References

Italian motorcycle Grand Prix
Italian
Motorcycle Grand Prix